The 1909 Haskell Indians football team was an American football team that represented the Haskell Indian Institute (now known as Haskell Indian Nations University) as an independent during the 1909 college football season. In its second and final season under head coach John R. Bender, Haskell compiled a 7–2 record and outscored opponents by a total of 142 to 73. Its victories included games against Texas (12–11) and Nebraska (16–5); its losses were to Baylor (0–12) and Texas A&M (0–15).

Schedule

References

Haskell
Haskell Indian Nations Fighting Indians football seasons
Haskell Indians football